Sensation Hunters is a 1933 American pre-Code B movie directed by Charles Vidor, starring Arline Judge, Preston Foster and Marion Burns, and released by Monogram Pictures.  The film briefly features Walter Brennan as a stuttering waiter.

Cast
 Arline Judge as Jerry Royal
 Preston Foster as Tom Baylor
 Marion Burns as Dale Jordan
 Kenneth MacKenna as Jimmy Crosby
 Juanita Hansen as Trixie Snell
 Creighton Hale as Fred Barrett
 Cyril Chadwick as Upson
 Nella Walker as Mrs. Grayson
 Walter Brennan as Stuttering Waiter

Soundtrack
Arline Judge and chorus - "If It Ain't One Man" (Written by Bernie Grossman and Harold Lewis)
Marion Burns - "There's Something In the Air" (Written by Bernie Grossman and Harold Lewis)

External links
 
 

1933 films
1933 drama films
American drama films
American black-and-white films
Monogram Pictures films
Films directed by Charles Vidor
1933 directorial debut films
1930s English-language films
1930s American films